Wang Xiaohe is a Chinese former football coach who last managed the Pakistan national football team from 2003 to 2004.

Pakistan
Installed as head coach of the Pakistan national team in December 2003 on the recommendations of the Pakistan Army club, with Tariq Lutfi and Balal Butt being named as his assistants, Wang was known for his stringent training program which focused on footballers' stamina during his time there.

References 

Year of birth missing (living people)
Living people
Chinese football managers
Expatriate football managers in Pakistan
Pakistan national football team managers
Chinese expatriate sportspeople in Pakistan
Footballers at the 1974 Asian Games
Asian Games competitors for China
Association footballers not categorized by position
Association football players not categorized by nationality
Chinese expatriate football managers